The Invincible Six is a 1970 American-Iranian adventure film directed by Jean Negulesco and starring Stuart Whitman, Elke Sommer, Curd Jürgens, and Ian Ogilvy. Six international criminals attempt to steal the crown jewels of Iran, but in the tradition of 1954 film Seven Samurai and the 1960 film The Magnificent Seven, end up defending a village from bandits. In Britain and several other countries it was picked up for distribution by Paramount Pictures.

Plot
An adventurous American whom everybody calls Tex, and his partners, the mechanically savvy Mike and an Englishman named Ronald, are foiled in their bid to steal Tehran's precious jewels. In the desert, they join up with three other criminals, an Iranian, an Italian, and a German, to plot another heist.

They have the good fortune of meeting Zari, the beautiful mistress of the infamous bandit Malik, who is after a valuable amulet. So is the man who wants to claim Malik's place in the eyes of all, Nazar, but all does not go well. Ronald is captured and tortured, Nazar is shot, and Zari is soon forced to decide if she wishes to continue on to wherever fate takes Tex next.

Cast
 Stuart Whitman as Tex
 Elke Sommer as Zari
 Curd Jürgens as Baron Karl von Bitterhofen
 James Mitchum  as  Nazar
 Ian Ogilvy as Ronald
 Behrouz Vossoughi as Jahan
 Lon Satton as Mike
 Isarco Ravaioli as Giorgio
 Pouri Banayi as Jahan's wife

See also
 List of American films of 1970

References

External links
 

1970 films
American adventure films
1970s adventure films
English-language Iranian films
Films shot in Iran
Films scored by Manos Hatzidakis
Iranian adventure films
1970s Persian-language films
Iranian multilingual films
American multilingual films
1970s English-language films
1970 multilingual films
1970s American films